Rok Kolander (born 8 February 1980 in Maribor) is a Slovenian rower who represented Slovenia at the 2008 Summer Olympics in the Men's Coxless Four.

References

1980 births
Living people
Slovenian male rowers
Olympic rowers of Slovenia
Rowers at the 2000 Summer Olympics
Rowers at the 2008 Summer Olympics
Sportspeople from Maribor
Mediterranean Games bronze medalists for Slovenia
Competitors at the 2005 Mediterranean Games
Mediterranean Games medalists in rowing
World Rowing Championships medalists for Slovenia
21st-century Slovenian people